Cuba competed at the 1960 Summer Olympics in Rome, Italy. 12 competitors, 9 men and 3 women, took part in 15 events in 8 sports.

Athletics

Boxing

Fencing

One fencer represented Cuba in 1960.

Men's épée
 Abelardo Menéndez

Gymnastics

Sailing

Swimming

Weightlifting

Wrestling

References

External links
Official Olympic Reports	

Nations at the 1960 Summer Olympics
1960
Olympics